The 2012 Meyers Norris Penny Charity Classic was held from October 12 to 15 at the Medicine Hat Curling Club in Medicine Hat, Alberta as part of the 2012–13 World Curling Tour. The event was held in a triple knockout format. The purse for the men's event is CAD$37,000, and the winner, David Nedohin, received CAD$10,000. The purse for the women's event was CAD$30,000, and the winner, Lisa Eyamie, received CAD$8,000. Nedohin defeated Randy Bryden of Saskatchewan in the men's final with a score of 5–4, while Eberle defeated Lisa Eyamie in the women's final with a score of 7–2.

Men

Teams
The teams are listed as follows:

Knockout results
The draw is listed as follows:

A event

B event

C event

Playoffs

Women

Teams
The teams are listed as follows:

Knockout results
The draw is listed as follows:

A event

B event

C event

Playoffs

References

External links

Meyers Norris
Meyers Norris
Meyers Norris
Sport in Medicine Hat